The 2023 New Mexico State Aggies football team will represent New Mexico State University in the 2023 NCAA Division I FBS football season. The Aggies will play their home games at Aggie Memorial Stadium in Las Cruces, New Mexico, and will compete as a first year member of Conference USA. They will be led by second-year head coach Jerry Kill.

Schedule
New Mexico State and Conference USA announced the 2023 football schedule on January 10, 2023.

References

New Mexico State
New Mexico State Aggies football seasons
New Mexico State Aggies football